The Ovche Pole Offensive Operation was an operation of the Bulgarian Army that  occurred between 14 October 1915 and 15 November 1915 as part of the Serbian Campaign in World War I. Its aim was to seize the Vardar river valley, and to cut the vital railway linking Skopje with Thessaloniki to prevent the Serbian Army from being resupplied and reinforced by the Franco-British Allied forces. The Bulgarian forces consisted of the Second Army (3rd Balkan Infantry Division, 7th Rila Division and the Cavalry Division with 182 guns) under the command of Lieutenant General Georgi Todorov.

The main blow was at Kumanovo where the Bulgarian 3rd and 7th divisions easily defeated the outnumbered Serbian army. On the third day the Bulgarian Cavalry Division also advanced, defeating the Serbian counter-attack and reaching Veles and the Vardar. With this success the aim was achieved. While fighting against the Serbs, the Bulgarians defeated two French divisions in the Battle of Krivolak and conclusively cut the way between the Serbs and the Allies, resulting in the fall of Serbia after the Kosovo Offensive Operation in 1915.

References

Sources
 
"Българската армия в Световната война 1915-1918",Том III;Държавна печатница София 1938.

Notes
 The  number includes the Serbian forces located in Macedonia at the  Albanian border on 13 October 1915 - 11,650 rifles,24 cannons and 12 machine guns.

Ovche Pole
Ovche Pole
Ovche Pole
Conflicts in 1915
1915 in Bulgaria
1915 in Serbia
October 1915 events
November 1915 events